Panta Lunjevica (1840–1887) was a Serbian higher administrative officer, the chief (načelnik) of the Šabac district (srez or okrug), at one point also of the Belgrade district. He was educated, formerly working as a military officer and policeman. He was a loyal to the Obrenović dynasty and a liberal. Panta was the son of Nikola Lunjevica (1776–1842), a commander (vojvoda) of the Serbian Revolution and close comrade of Prince Miloš. With his mother Đurđija, Panta renovated the Vujan Monastery in 1858, which had earlier been renovated by his father in 1800. He founded the library in Aranđelovac. With his wife Anđelija Koljević, he had seven children; two sons, Nikola and Nikodije, and five daughters, Hristina, Đina, Ana, Draga and Vojka. Draga was the Queen consort of Serbia (1900–1903) as the wife of King Aleksandar Obrenović.

References

Sources

1840 births
1887 deaths
19th-century Serbian people
Serbian politicians
People from the Principality of Serbia
People from Gornji Milanovac